Guanine nucleotide-binding protein G(I)/G(S)/G(T) subunit beta-1 is a protein that in humans is encoded by the GNB1 gene.

Function 

Heterotrimeric guanine nucleotide-binding proteins (G proteins), which integrate signals between receptors and effector proteins, are composed of an alpha, a beta, and a gamma subunit. These subunits are encoded by families of related genes. This gene encodes a beta subunit. Beta subunits are important regulators of alpha subunits, as well as of certain signal transduction receptors and effectors. This gene uses alternative polyadenylation signals.

Interactive pathway map

Interactions 

GNB1 has been shown to interact with GNG4.

References

Further reading

External links